The Friedrichshafen FF.8 was a seaplane built in Germany in the early 1910s.

Specifications (FF.8)

References

Bibliography

Further reading

Friedrichshafen aircraft
Floatplanes